Live My Life is the third studio album by Boris. It was released at 30 January 2009, on the Bo-Rush / Upper Room label, and distributed by Rough Trade Benelux. Main producer is Antoon Tolsma (DutchFlower). The preliminary single "If You Wanna Roll with Me" has been released on 7 November 2008.

The album reached the charts with a number 4 entry during the first week in the Dutch Album Top 100.

Track listing
All songs were written by Boris Titulaer and Anthony Tolsma, except where noted.
"Bubblin'" – 2:54
"Everything About You" – 3:12
"If You Wanna Roll With Me" – 2:26
"Stupid Again" – 3:32
"Live My Life" (Titulaer, Tolsma, B. Tam) – 3:19
"One World" – 3:17
"Loosen Up" – 4:30
"I'm Sorry" – 3:12
"Leave it Alone" (Titulaer, Marcus Machado, Micheal Johnson) – 4:36
"The Ohhhh Song" – 3:44
"I Want You to Know" (Titulaer, Machado, Johnson) – 4:36
"Do You Love Me" (Titulaer, Machado) – 4:59 (+ hidden track – One World (Acoustic))

References

Boris Titulaer albums
2009 albums